Zaza Korinteli (born 29 December 1973), better known by his stage name Zumba, is a Georgian rock musician, folklorist and civic activist. His music fuses a wide variety of genres, principally Georgian folk tradition, rock, and reggae. Being a multi-instrumentalist on guitar, bass, wind instruments, percussions, and vocals, he leads the band ZumbaLand and also collaborates within several other musical projects. His stage name is an acronym of a Georgian phrase zogjer ubralod moindome, bolos agisruldeba, translated as "Just wish sometimes – it will eventually come true."

Biography 
Born in Tbilisi, Korinteli graduated from the Department of Psychology, Tbilisi State University and 1997–2000 Kraków Academy of Modern Music and Jazz. He founded his first band in 1993 and named it ZumbaLand. The group initially performed in the streets, parks and metro stations of Tbilisi and recorded its debut album "I am waiting for the sunrise" in 1995. It went on to win two nationwide rock music festivals in 1996. In 1997, Korinteli disbanded the group and moved to Kraków, Poland, where the band was reincarnated featuring Georgian, Polish, Ukrainian, and American musicians. This line-up toured Poland at the end of the 1990s and recorded the album "Project Union" in 2000. The same year, Korinteli returned to Georgia and assembled a new band which has since maintained its lineup. It has since recorded three studio albums "Euroremonti" (2002), Jolo (2004) and Adila (2006), staged nationwide tours and performed at various festivals and concerts in Georgia, Ukraine, and Russia, including jamming with the American jazz musicians Alfred "Pee Wee" Ellis and Richard Bona.
Soundtracks for films "Travelling in folklore"; "Adila", "Everything will  be all right". Theater music: "New year's Tale" (Poland), "People from Yesterday" (Liberty Theatre)

In 2007 Zaza Korinteli's song "Hello, Abkhazia" has won the national competition "Patrinote".
Korinteli is also known for his work as a cultural ambassador for Georgia and his promotion of Georgian folk music and folklore in general. He founded, in 2004, and has since managed an annual summertime folk culture festival Art-Gene hosted by Open Air Museum of Ethnography at Tbilisi. The festival also tours across Georgia, popularizing Georgian folk culture and collecting its obscure examples in the countryside. He is called as Ambassador of Georgian Culture.
In 2009, Zaza Korinteli recorded  CD album of his new musical project AstroGeorgia. AstroGeorgia represents a musical performance of the "world music" (The whole project could be also called as "World Music from Georgia"). Zaza Korinteli's new musical project's first tour was in Baltic countries (Estonia-Tallinn: open-air festival "World Days"-in Estonia, Latvia-Riga, Lithuania-Vilnius, Vilkija, Kaunas.) International Festival "Art-Gene"-in Georgia, Black Sea Jazz Festival-Georgia (where participated in great musicians: Hugh Masekela, Mike Stern, Dave Weckl, Randy Brecker, Chris Minh Doky, Roy Hargrove). Zaza Korinteli-Zumba is founder of the "World Music Festival In Mestia", he was main organizer of the "5 star October" in Batumi.
In 2009 Zaza korinteli founded non-profit organization Tsami, one of the goals of which is development of traditional and modern culture and art. Significant contribution in the development of Georgian culture, he was awarded the Presidential Order of Excellence by President of Georgia Mikheil Saakashvili in 2012.

Albums 
2011-"MultiTest" (Lithuania)
2010-"AstroGeorgia"
2006-"Adila"
2005-"Mgzavruli"
2004-"Jolo"/"Raspberry"
2002-"EuroRemont"
2000-"Project Union" (Poland)
1995-"I'm waiting for Sun Rise"

References

External links 

 

1973 births
Rock musicians from Georgia (country)
Activists from Georgia (country)
Musicians from Tbilisi
Living people
Recipients of the Presidential Order of Excellence